To view inclusive lists of opera companies by location see the following:
 List of Latin American and South American opera companies
 List of North American opera companies
 List of opera companies in Africa and the Middle East
 List of opera companies in Asia, Australia, and Oceania
 List of opera companies in Europe

 
Lists of music organizations